Denis Bakhtov (born December 7, 1979 in Kazakhstan) is a Russian professional boxer.

Professional career
On October 11 2014 Bakhtov fought future world champion Anthony Joshua, losing by technical knockout in the second round. 

In 2015 Bakhtov was suspended after his fight against Arnold Gjergjaj due to failing a test which detected banned substances.

Professional boxing record

|-
|align="center" colspan=8|39 Wins (26 knockouts, 13 decisions), 19 Losses (11 knockouts, 7 decisions)
|-
| align="center" style="border-style: none none solid solid; background: #e3e3e3"|Result
| align="center" style="border-style: none none solid solid; background: #e3e3e3"|Record
| align="center" style="border-style: none none solid solid; background: #e3e3e3"|Opponent
| align="center" style="border-style: none none solid solid; background: #e3e3e3"|Type
| align="center" style="border-style: none none solid solid; background: #e3e3e3"|Round
| align="center" style="border-style: none none solid solid; background: #e3e3e3"|Date
| align="center" style="border-style: none none solid solid; background: #e3e3e3"|Location
| align="center" style="border-style: none none solid solid; background: #e3e3e3"|Notes
|
|align=left|
|- align=center
|Loss
|
|align=left| Ivan Dychko
|
| 
|10/07/2021
|align=left| Baluan Sholak Sports Palace, Almaty, Kazakhstan
|align=left|
|-align=center
|Loss
|
|align=left| Abdulkerim Edilov
|
| 
|03/09/2020
|align=left| Grozny, Russia
|align=left|
|-align=center
|Loss
|
|align=left| Evgenios Lazaridis
|
| 
|21/09/2019
|align=left| Sporthalle, Zinnowitz, Mecklenburg-Vorpommern, Germany
|align=left|
|-align=center
|Loss
|
|align=left| Vladyslav Sirenko
|
| 
|23/06/2019
|align=left| Time Square, Menlyn, Pretoria, Gauteng, South Africa
|align=left|
|-align=center
|Loss
|
|align=left| Petar Milas
|
| 
|06/04/2019
|align=left| Ballhaus Forum, Unterschleißheim, Bayern, Germany
|align=left|
|-align=center
|Loss
|
|align=left| Hussein Muhamed
|
| 
|28/12/2018
|align=left| Gildehaus, Luechow, Niedersachsen, Germany
|align=left|
|-align=center
|Loss
|
|align=left| Evgeny Romanov
|
| 
|22/04/2018
|align=left| DIVS, Ekaterinburg, Russia
|align=left|
|-align=center
|- align=center
|Loss
|
|align=left| Viktar Chvarkou
|
| 
|30/09/2017
|align=left| Sports Palace Quant, Troitsk, Moscow
|align=left|
|-align=center
|Loss
|
|align=left| Arnold Gjergjaj
|
| 
|07/06/2015
|align=left| Basel, Switzerland
|align=left|
|-align=center
|Win
|
|align=left| Yuri Lunev
|
| 
|08/11/2014
|align=left| Narva, Estonia
|align=left|
|- align=center
|Loss
|
|align=left| Anthony Joshua
|TKO
|
|
|align=left|
|align=left|
|-align=center
|Win
|
|align=left| Konstantin Airich
|
| 
|26/07/2014
|align=left| Riga, Latvia
|align=left|
|-align=center
|Win
|
|align=left| Sedrak Agagulyan
|
| 
|12/04/2014
|align=left| Saint-Petersburg, Russia
|align=left|
|-align=center
|Loss
|
|align=left| Manuel Charr
|
| 
|19/10/2013
|align=left| Sachsen, Germany
|align=left|
|-align=center
|Win
|
|align=left| Danny Williams
|UD
|10
|08/12/2012
|align=left| Podolsk, Russia
|align=center|
|-
|Loss
|
|align=left| Andrzej Wawrzyk
|UD
|10
|02/06/2012
|align=left| Bydgoszcz, Poland
|align=left|
|-
|Win
|
|align=left| Serhiy Babych
|TKO
|2
|19/05/2012
|align=left| Klimovsk, Russia
|align=left|
|-
|Win
|
|align=left| Jonte Willis
|SD
|8
|04/04/2012
|align=left| Crocus City Hall, Moscow, Russia
|align=left|
|-
|Loss
|
|align=left| Alexander Ustinov
|UD
|12
|22/10/2011
|align=left| Cherkasy, Ukraine
|align=left|
|-
|Loss
|
|align=left| Vyacheslav Glazkov
|UD
|8
|26/03/2011
|align=left| Ekaterinburg, Sverdlovsk Oblast, Russia
|align=left|
|-
|Win
|
|align=left| Steffen Kretschmann
|TKO
|9
|27/03/2010
|align=left| Alsterdorf, Hamburg, Germany
|align=left|
|-
|Win
|
|align=left| Edgars Kalnars
|KO
|1
|19/12/2009
|align=left| Ekaterinburg, Sverdlovsk Oblast, Russia
|align=left|
|-
|Win
|
|align=left| Sherzod Mamajanov
|KO
|4
|24/10/2009
|align=left| Ekaterinburg, Sverdlovsk Oblast, Russia
|align=left|
|-
|Win
|
|align=left| Steffen Kretschmann
|TKO
|1
|26/06/2009
|align=left| Völklingen, Saarland, Germany
|align=left|
|-
|Win
|
|align=left| Isroil Kurbanov
|UD
|6
|30/04/2009
|align=left| Moscow, Russia
|align=left|
|-
|Win
|
|align=left| Mazur Ali
|TKO
|4
|20/09/2008
|align=left| Salavat, Bashkortostan, Russia
|align=left|
|-
|Win
|
|align=left| Juho Haapoja
|KO
|10
|22/05/2008
|align=left| Saint Petersburg, Russia
|align=left|
|-
|Win
|
|align=left| Corey "T-Rex" Sanders
|UD
|6
|23/12/2007
|align=left| Halle an der Saale, Sachsen-Anhalt, Germany
|align=left|
|-
|Win
|
|align=left| Sedrak Agagulyan
|TKO
|6
|25/10/2007
|align=left| Ekaterinburg, Sverdlovsk Oblast, Russia
|align=left|
|-
|Loss
|
|align=left| Juan Carlos Gomez
|UD
|12
|16/06/2007
|align=left| Ankara, Turkey
|align=left|
|-
|Win
|
|align=left| Awadh Tamim
|TKO
|3
|24/03/2007
|align=left| Almaty, Kazakhstan
|align=left|
|-
|Win
|
|align=left| Andriy Oliynyk
|UD
|12
|03/12/2006
|align=left| Ekaterinburg, Sverdlovsk Oblast, Russia
|align=left|
|-
|Win
|
|align=left| Ihar Shukala
|TKO
|3
|11/05/2006
|align=left| Ekaterinburg, Sverdlovsk Oblast, Russia
|align=left|
|-
|Win
|
|align=left| Joseph Akhasamba
|UD
|10
|24/02/2006
|align=left| Yugorsk, Yugra, Russia
|align=left|
|-
|Loss
|
|align=left| Saul Montana
|TKO
|5
|27/04/2005
|align=left| Moscow, Russia
|align=left|
|-
|Win
|
|align=left| Nuri Seferi
|UD
|10
|11/02/2005
|align=left| Saint Petersburg, Russia
|align=left|
|-
|Loss
|
|align=left| Sinan Samil Sam
|TKO
|10
|20/11/2004
|align=left| Kempten, Bayern, Germany
|align=left|
|-
|Win
|
|align=left| Raman Sukhaterin
|UD
|6
|16/06/2004
|align=left| Minsk, Belarus
|align=left|
|-
|Win
|
|align=left| Vitali Shkraba
|TKO
|8
|30/04/2004
|align=left| Saint Petersburg, Russia
|align=left|
|-
|Win
|
|align=left| Keith Long
|UD
|12
|24/01/2004
|align=left| Wembley, London, United Kingdom
|align=left|
|-
|Win
|
|align=left| Oleksandr Myleiko
|TKO
|1
|16/07/2003
|align=left| Saint Petersburg, Russia
|align=left|
|-
|Win
|
|align=left| Garing "Freight Train" Lane
|TKO
|4
|19/04/2003
|align=left| Saint Petersburg, Russia
|align=left|
|-
|Win
|
|align=left| Baldwin Hlongwane
|TKO
|3
|21/12/2002
|align=left| Saint Petersburg, Russia
|align=left|
|-
|Win
|
|align=left| Kostyantyn Pryziuk
|UD
|6
|29/08/2002
|align=left| Vyborg, Leningrad Oblast, Russia
|align=left|
|-
|Win
|
|align=left| Mihail Bekish
|TKO
|5
|13/06/2002
|align=left| Saint Petersburg, Russia
|align=left|
|-
|Win
|
|align=left| Matthew Ellis
|TKO
|5
|02/03/2002
|align=left| Bethnal Green, London, United Kingdom
|align=left|
|-
|Win
|
|align=left| Vitali Strelkov
|TKO
|2
|20/12/2001
|align=left| Saint Petersburg, Russia
|align=left|
|-
|Win
|
|align=left| Alvin "The Chipmunk" Miller
|KO
|1
|22/09/2001
|align=left| Bethnal Green, London, United Kingdom
|align=left|
|-
|Win
|
|align=left| Mindaugas Kulikauskas
|RTD
|1
|01/08/2001
|align=left| Vyborg, Leningrad Oblast, Russia
|align=left|
|-
|Win
|
|align=left| Alexander "The Great" Vasiliev
|TKO
|8
|13/04/2001
|align=left| Moscow, Russia
|align=left|
|-
|Win
|
|align=left| Dmitri Bannov
|TKO
|4
|01/03/2001
|align=left| Kohtla-Järve, Estonia
|align=left|
|-
|Win
|
|align=left| Alexey Varakin
|KO
|2
|08/02/2001
|align=left| Ekaterinburg, Sverdlovsk Oblast, Russia
|align=left|
|-
|Loss
|
|align=left| Matthew Ellis
|PTS
|4
|16/09/2000
|align=left| Bethnal Green, London, United Kingdom
|align=left|
|-
|Win
|
|align=left| Vladislav Berlev
|UD
|4
|17/05/2000
|align=left| Saint Petersburg, Russia
|align=left|
|-
|Win
|
|align=left| Mikhail Nikitin
|TKO
|2
|28/04/2000
|align=left| Moscow, Russia
|align=left|
|-
|Win
|
|align=left| Sergey "Iron Pause" Tretyakov
|UD
|4
|10/03/2000
|align=left| Saint Petersburg, Russia
|align=left|
|-
|Loss
|
|align=left| Alexey Varakin
|TKO
|4
|07/10/1999
|align=left| Saint Petersburg, Russia
|align=center|
|-
|Win
|
|align=left| Vladislav Belonogov
|KO
|1
|29/09/1999
|align=left| Moscow, Russia
|align=left|
|}

References

External links
 

Living people
1979 births
Russian male boxers
Doping cases in boxing
Heavyweight boxers